Vachellia tortilis, widely known as Acacia tortilis but now attributed to the genus Vachellia, is the umbrella thorn acacia,  also known as umbrella thorn and Israeli babool, a medium to large canopied tree native to most of Africa, primarily to the savanna and Sahel of Africa (especially the Somali peninsula and Sudan), but also occurring in the Middle East.

Distribution and growing conditions 
Vachellia tortilis is widespread in Africa, being found in countries like Tunisa, Morocco, Uganda, Angola, Zimbabwe, Djibouti, and Botswana.

Characteristics 
In extremely arid conditions, it may occur as a small, wiry bush. The tree carries leaves that grow to approx.  in length with between 4 and 10 pair of pinnae each with up to 15 pairs of leaflets. Flowers are small and white, highly aromatic, and occur in tight clusters. Seeds are produced in pods which are flat and coiled into a springlike structure.

The plant is known to tolerate high alkalinity, drought, high temperatures, sandy and stony soils, strongly sloped rooting surfaces and sandblasting.  Also, plants older than two years have been observed to be somewhat frost resistant.

Importance 
Timber from the tree is used for furniture, wagon wheels, fence posts, cages, and pens. Vachellia wood was also used exclusively by the Israelites in the Old Testament in the building of the tabernacle and the tabernacle furniture, including the Ark of the Covenant. The pods and foliage, which grow prolifically on the tree, are used as fodder for desert grazing animals.  The bark is often used as a string medium in Tanganyika, and is a source for tannin.  Gum from the tree is edible and can be used as gum arabic.  Parts of the tree including roots, shoots, and pods are also often used by natives for a vast number of purposes including decorations, weapons, tools, and medicines.

The Umbrella thorn is also an important species for rehabilitation of degraded arid land; it tolerates drought, wind, salinity and a wide range of soil types, and has the additional benefit of fixing nitrogen, an essential plant nutrient, in the soil via its interaction with symbiotic root bacteria.

References

External links 

 Vachellia tortilis (as Acacia tortilis) (www.fao.org)
 Purdue University's detailed article on the Umbrella Thorn Acacia.

 Vachellia tortilis (as Acacia tortilis) Israel wildflowers and native plants

tortilis
Flora of Western Asia
Flora of the Arabian Peninsula
Trees of Africa
Plants used in traditional African medicine